The 1934–35 Cypriot First Division was the 1st season of the Cypriot top-level football league. Enosis Neon Trust won their 1st title.

Format
Eight teams participated in the 1934–35 Cypriot First Division. All teams played against each other twice, once at their home and once away. The team with the most points at the end of the season crowned champions.

Point system
Teams received two points for a win, one point for a draw and zero points for a loss.

Stadiums and locations
The table below shows the stadiums of each team.

League standings

Results

See also
 Cypriot First Division
 1934–35 Cypriot Cup
 Cypriot First Division top goalscorers

References

Sources

Bibliography
 
 
 

Cypriot First Division seasons
Cyprus
1934–35 in Cypriot football